Maldivian Americans are Americans whose ethnic origins lie fully or partially in any part of the Maldives.

Population
According to the United States Census Bureau, in 2000, there were 51 Maldivians in the United States. By 2010, the population of Maldivians in the United States increased to 127.

References

Asian-American society
South Asian American